The SATIS Expo is an annual trade show targeted at media broadcasters in French-speaking markets. The 2014 show in Porte de Versailles was the "32nd edition" with over 15000 attendees.

See also 
SATIS Expo English-speaking page

References

1982 establishments in France
Annual fairs
Recurring events established in 1982
Trade fairs in France